Arno Villringer (born 1958, Schopfheim, Germany) is a Director at the Department of Neurology  at the Max Planck Institute for Human Cognitive and Brain Sciences in Leipzig, Germany; Director of the Department of Cognitive Neurology at University of Leipzig Medical Center; and Academic Director of the Berlin School of Mind and Brain  and the Mind&Brain Institute, Berlin. He holds a full professorship at University of Leipzig and an honorary professorship at Charité, Humboldt-Universität zu Berlin. From July 2022 to June 2025 he is the Chairperson of the Human Sciences Section of the Max Planck Society.

Academic career and achievements
Arno Villringer studied medicine at the University of Freiburg (German: Albert-Ludwigs-Universität Freiburg) from 1977 to 1984, graduating with a Doctor of Medicine (summa cum laude) higher degree in 1984. After a fellowship at the Magnetic Resonance Imaging Unit at Massachusetts General Hospital at Harvard Medical School in 1985, he worked in Munich, Germany, becoming a board certified neurologist in 1992, and gaining his professorial degree (Habilitation) at the Ludwig Maximilian University of Munich in 1994.
From 1993 to 2007, he worked at the Department of Neurology at the Charité, Berlin, first as a consultant, and later as head of the Department of Neurology at the Benjamin Franklin Campus. Since 2006 he has been Academic Director of the Berlin School of Mind and Brain  and the Mind&Brain institute (since 2010), since 2007 he has been Director of the Department of Neurology at the Max Planck Institute for Human Cognitive and Brain Sciences in Leipzig, Germany, and director of the Department of Cognitive Neurology at the University of Leipzig Medical Center.

Research foci 
Research interests:

 Neurocognition of vascular risk factors and the path from risk factors to stroke and dementia
 Mind Brain Body interactions
 Neuroplasticity 
 Conscious and unconscious processing in the somatosensory system 	
 Diverse research methods including behavioral and neurocognitive testing, neuroimaging (MRI, EEG, MEG, fNIRS, EEG/fMRI), neurostimulation (TDCS, TMS, TACS, focused ultrasound), brain computer interfaces, and virtual reality.

Arno Villringer is the author of more than 600 academic articles (as of 2022) with more than >56000 citations, and an h-index of 116 (Google Scholar, August 2022) 

Pioneering work:

Perfusion tmaging:

Arno Villringer pioneered magnetic resonance perfusion imaging of the brain by demonstrating that susceptibility contrast agents such as GdDTPA may be employed in magnetic resonance imaging (MRI). The susceptibility-based contrast mechanism later became relevant for the Blood Oxygenation Level Dependent (BOLD) signal in functional magnetic resonance imaging (fMRI).

Optical imaging:

In 1993, Villringer showed feasibility of noninvasive functional near-infrared spectroscopy and imaging (fNIRS, fNIRI) of the human brain followed by > 50 publications establishing /validating fNIRS.
Physiology empowered brain imaging: Since 1992 his research focus has been on neurophysiological mechanisms underlying brain function and plasticity, using multi-modal brain imaging, e.g., signatures of neuronal inhibition in functional brain imaging, combined fNIRS/fMRI to establish relationship between BOLD and deoxy-Hb concentration in fMRI, combined EEG/fMRI to show fMRI correlates of background rhythms  and simultaneously assess neuronal spiking and fMRI.

Brain plasticity, development of vascular risk factors, stroke:

Villringer currently pursues the hypothesis that (maladaptive) brain plasticity is crucial for the development of vascular risk factors leading to stroke and for the (lack of) recovery after stroke, and that brain plasticity can be beneficially modified. For this purpose, he employs multi-modal brain imaging to understand basic neurophysiological mechanisms underlying human brain plasticity in cortical and subcortical brain areas, and their interaction. Behavioral correlates include sensorimotor function, reaction to stress, and emotions. The clinical applications are (i) prevention of vascular risk factors (obesity, hypertension) and subsequent stroke, and (ii) recovery after stroke.

Expert activities/board memberships: 

1999–present: German Competence Network Stroke, Berlin, Germany (Coordinator) 
2005–present: International Max Planck Research School on the Life Course, Berlin: Member of Faculty 
2008–present: Leipzig Research Center for Civilization Diseases (LIFE), Germany: Board of Directors
2010–2016: Integrated Research and Treatment Center (IFB) AdiposityDiseases: Steering Committee
2010–2018: Max Planck International Research Network on Aging (MaxNetAging), Rostock, Germany: Member
2011–present: Dialogforum Depression, Berlin, Germany: Initiator
2011–present: Research Initiative MPS-UCL, Berlin, Germany: Computational Psychiatry and Aging Research: Principal Investigator 
2012–2019: NeuroCure, Research Cluster of Excellence (German Excellence Initiative), Berlin, Germany: Principal Investigator 
2013–2021: Collaborative Research Center 1052 of the German Research Foundation [Sonderforschungsbereich der DFG] “Obesity Mechanisms”, Leipzig, Germany: Steering Committee 
2013–2020:	Spokesperson, International Max Planck Research School IMPRS NeuroCom, Leipzig, Germany 
2018–present: International Max Planck Research School IMPRS COMP2PSYCH: Faculty Member 
2018–present: Research Training Group 2386, Extrospection. External Access to Higher Cognitive Processes: Faculty Member 
2018–present: Spokesperson of the Max Planck School of Cognition (Germany-wide, 15 universities, 10 Max Planck Institutes) 
2020–present: Board Member, International Max Planck Research School IMPRS NeuroCom, Leipzig, Germany 
2021–2022: Deputy Chairperson, Human Sciences Section of the Max Planck Society 
2022–2025: Chairperson of the Human Sciences Section of the Max Planck Society (comprising 22 Max Planck Institutes) 
2022–2025:	ex officio member of the Senate of the Max Planck Society

Memberships in scientific arganizations

Deutsche Gesellschaft für Neurologie (Germany Neurological Society)
German Neuroscience Society](Founding Member, 1992)
German Stroke Society Deutsche Schlaganfall-Gesellschaft (Founding Member, 2001)
International Organization for Human Brain Mapping OHBM (Founding Member)
Society for Neuroscience (SfN)
International Society of Intracranial Hemodynamics (Phoenix, Founding Member, 1992)
International Society for Magnetic Resonance in Medicine (ISMRM)

Awards
Pater Leander Fischer Award, German Society of Laser Medicine (2005)
Gerhard Hess Award, DFG (1993)
DFG foreign exchange scholarship (1986)

References

External links
List of publications on Google Scholar.
Arno Villringer’s Personal Page at the Max Planck Institute
Department of Neurology at the Max Planck Institute

1958 births
Living people
German neurologists
University of Freiburg alumni
Academic staff of Leipzig University
People from Lörrach (district)
Max Planck Institute directors